Toms River: A Story of Science and Salvation is a 2013 non-fiction book by the American author Dan Fagin. It is about the dumping of industrial pollution by chemical companies including Ciba-Geigy, in Toms River, New Jersey, beginning in 1952 through the 1980s, and the epidemiological investigations of a cancer cluster that subsequently emerged there. The book won the 2014 Pulitzer Prize for General Non-Fiction, the 2014 Helen Bernstein Book Award for Excellence in Journalism, and the 2014 National Academies Communication Award.

Editions

 Audiobook narrated by Dan Woren, published by Random House Audio, March 19, 2013
 E-book editions

References

External links
The Diane Rehm Show, NPR, April 2013

2013 non-fiction books
2013 in the environment
Toms River, New Jersey
Pulitzer Prize for General Non-Fiction-winning works
Environmental non-fiction books
Environment of New Jersey
Pollution in the United States
Cancer clusters
Bantam Books books
Helen Bernstein Book Award for Excellence in Journalism